Ridouane Harroufi (born 30 July 1981 in Azrou) is a Moroccan long-distance runner who competes in road running competitions, including the marathon. He has won several high profile road races in the United States, including the Azalea Trail Run, Bay to Breakers, Boilermaker Road Race, Bolder Boulder, Cherry Blossom Ten Mile Run, Gate River Run and OneAmerica 500 Festival Mini-Marathon.

He represented Morocco three times at the IAAF World Cross Country Championships and twice at the IAAF World Half Marathon Championships.

Life and sports
He first represented his country at the IAAF World Cross Country Championships, running in the junior races in 1999 and 2000. He was sixth over 1500 metres at the 2000 World Junior Championships in Athletics. Moving up to the senior ranks, he came tenth at the 2003 IAAF World Half Marathon Championships to lead Morocco to fourth place in the men's team rankings. The year after he ran in the long race at the 2004 IAAF World Cross Country Championships, but managed only 63rd place.

He won the Parelloop 10K in race in the Netherlands in 2005.  On April 6, 2008, he won the Cherry Blossom 10-Mile Run in Washington D.C., and successfully defended his title on April 5, 2009. He won the Bolder Boulder race twice consecutively in 2007 and 2008.

He won the Cherry Blossom ten-miler in 45 minutes and 56 seconds, the fastest time in the event since Simon Rono ran 45:51 in 1998. He also won the Boilermaker Road Race in Utica, New York and Azalea Trail Run that year. He came ninth at the 2010 Chicago Marathon in a time of 2:13:01 hours.

On May 15, 2011 Harroufi won the 100th Bay to Breakers 12K in San Francisco California with a time of 34 minutes and 26 seconds, breaking a string of 20 consecutive event victories by runners from Kenya. He won the 34th annual Boilermaker Road Race for the second time in his career on July 10, 2011.  His official race time was 43 minutes and 30 seconds. He ran at the 2011 Fukuoka Marathon and was ninth overall.

He gained American citizen and became eligible to represent the United States internationally in 2020.

International competitions

References

External links

IAAF Focus on Africans
2008 Credit Union Cherry Blossom Ten Mile Run Article

1981 births
Living people
People from Azrou
Moroccan male long-distance runners
Moroccan male marathon runners
Moroccan male cross country runners
American male long-distance runners
American male cross country runners
American male marathon runners
Doping cases in athletics
Moroccan sportspeople in doping cases
20th-century Moroccan people
21st-century Moroccan people